Mieczysław Wolfke (29 May 1883 – 4 May 1947) was a Polish physicist, professor at the Warsaw University of Technology, the forerunner of holography and television. He discovered the method of solidification of helium as well as two types of liquid helium. He was a Masonic Grand Master of the National Grand Lodge of Poland from 1931–1934. He served as president of the Polish Physical Society between 1930–1934.

Biography 
Mieczysław Władysław Wolfke was born on 29 May 1883 in Łask near Łódź. His father, Karol Juliusz Wolfke, was a road engineer.

In 1892 Mieczysław and his parents moved to Częstochowa where his father became a district roadside engineer. At the age of 12, Wolfke wrote a dissertation about interplanetary travelling (especially to the Moon). It contained the theory of spaceships driven by the jet force. He also presented scientific hypotheses supported by mathematical models. 

In Częstochowa Mieczysław completed five years of the gymnasium for boys. Then he continued his education in Realschule in Sosnowiec which he graduated in 1902. At the age of 17, Wolfke developed a device which he called "telektroskop" (telectrosope). This invention was used to send images at a distance via electromagnetic waves. It was a prototype of television and Wolfke patented it in Russia and Germany. This patent received appreciation at the exhibition of the Polytechnic Society in Lviv in 1902 and gave him recognition in the world.

In 1902 Mieczysław Wolfke moved to Leodium, Belgium to start studying at the university. Because of the low standard of laboratories and inadequate equipment, he went to Sorbonne in Paris. In Paris he got acquainted with ideas of Freemasonry.  In 1907 he failed the bachelor's exam and moved to Wroclaw (at that time Germany). He entered the University of Breslau and in 1910 he passed with the doctorate of Philosophy (PhD) for his dissertation on the ability of resolution of optical systems on the example of microscope. Professor Otto Lummer was his supervisor. After the annulment of his first marriage, in March 1912 he married Agnes Erica Ritzmann.

After the patent of the cadmium-mercury lamp, which he and Karl Ritzmann (in the next years his brother-in-law) received in 1909, Wolfke was employed at the Carl Zeiss Company in Jena. However, working in the industry did not match his ambitions, in 1912 he went to Karlsruhe, where he worked as an assistant of professor Otto Lehmann at the Faculty of Physics at the local Polytechnic for four months. Soon after that, he moved to Zurich, where on 26 May 1913 he received a habilitation at the ETH (reviewers: Albert Einstein and Pierre Weiss) and in the next year – at the kantonal University (reviewers Max von Laue and Alfred Kleiner). Until the end of his stay in Zurich he lectured at both of these universities. He also worked for Carl Zeiss and Brown Boveri, but he consistently rejected any propositions of permanent and well-paid jobs in the industry. In 1915 his son, Karol Wolfke, was born and in 1918, the daughter, Lucyna was born.

After the restoration of Poland's independence in 1918, Wolfke obtained a Polish passport. In 1920 he got a proposal to take the position of professor at the University of Warsaw and accepted the nomination, but due to the financial problems and the lack of a laboratory, he did not undertake this job. In 1921 he obtained a successive habilitation at the University of Zurich (reviewers: Edgar Meyer and Erwin Schrödinger).

In 1922 Wolfke got a position of professor at the Warsaw University of Technology and returned to Poland. At the Warsaw University of Technology he led the Department of Physics on the Faculty of Electrotechnics. In 1924 he started the cooperation with the Institute of Low Temperatures in Leiden.

In 1926 his second son, Stefan Wolfke, was born.

In the early thirties, Wolfke started to organize the Low Temperatures Institute. In 1938 he took part in the organization of the flight of Polish stratospheric balloon called "Star of Poland". The first flight was unsuccessful and the second one was precluded by the World War II.

After the beginning of the World War II Wolfke was arrested (10@th November 1939), sent to Pawiak where he spent a week in cell number 49. After the release Mieczysław Wolfke managed (with the agreement of the occupier) the Research Department of Technical Physics and then lectured at the Higher State Technical School created in polytechnic buildings. He also organized support for the conspiracy and participated in underground teaching.

In May 1944, Mieczysław's daughter Lucyna Rassalska died.

The events of 1944 separated Mieczysław from his family. Mieczysław went to Cracow, while his wife, son-in-law and grandson stayed in the Warsaw University of Technology until the end of the Warsaw Uprising. After the end of it they were resettled to Cracow. Mieczysław's sons stayed in camps in Germany until the end of the war . In 1944 Mieczysław Wolfke married Krystyna Chądzyńska in Kraków.

After the end of military actions, Wolfke took part in the reconstruction of Polish science. He lectured at the University of Mining and Metallurgy in Cracow and at the Gdansk University of Technology. He also was involved in the formation of the Silesian University of Technology in Gliwice. In December 1945 he returned to Warsaw where he started to organize the Faculty of Physics at Warsaw University of Technology. At the time of reconstruction of the Faculty of Physics (building was destroyed during the Warsaw Uprising) Mieczysław Wolfke was delegated to foreign scientific centers to acquire the knowledge about an actual situation of world's scientific research, an organization of institutes and also to buy a modern apparatus.

4 May 1947 Mieczysław Wolfke died suddenly in Zurich and was buried at Sihlfeld cemetery.

Scientific activities 
Mieczysław Wolfke became interested in science at a pretty early age. In 1895 he wrote "Planetostat" – a dissertation about interplanetary communication and in 1901 – "Abstraktyka" – a philosophical dissertation about "science of science". However, these treatises were only in the form of manuscripts. In 1898 he patented in Russia and Germany a telectroscope. It was based on modified, rotating Nipkow disk, photosensitive selenium electrode and Geissler tube with brightness modulation. Wolfke was inspired by Jan Szczepanik's telectroscope (invented a few years earlier), but his project was wireless using electromagnetic waves. Two years later he devised a mathematical theory of surface displacements on a plane.

His first science publication: "Electron, considered as a center of pressure in ether" was written in 1907 in Paris. In the same year he had a presentation in the Astronomical Society in Paris about the idea of a telescope with a concave mirror – it was giving larger magnification than before. In recognition the Society invited him to participate in it.

After arrival to Wrocław, Wolfke invented in 1908 a cathode tube with a glass window, and in 1909 with Karl Ritzmann he patented a cadmium-mercury lamp. He later sold his rights to it to the Carl-Zeiss Jena company, where he worked for a year after obtaining his doctorate. At University of Wrocław in the Otto Lummer’s team Wolfke worked at the generalization of the Abbe’s theory of optical imaging for non-linear gratings. In 1910 he obtained degree of Doctor of Philosophy (PhD) for dissertation about the resolving power of optical systems on example of microscope. Despite many great scientific achievements in his later years, Mieczysław Wolfke judged its content the most valuable.

During the stay in Zurich Mieczysław Wolfke was a member of a narrow group of physicists who created the paths of the world physics. In 1916 he started to study subject of Anode rays and – in 1917 – melting of tungsten (together with Gmür e CO company) and also on mercury Rectifiers. One year later his interests changed to carbon lamps, tungsten smelting and nitrogen combustion. At this time he published also dissertation "Über die Möglichkeit der optischen Abbildung von Molekulargittern" – (About a possibility of optical imaging of molecular gratings) – the world's first concept of holography and the second of the achievements cherished the most by himself. This thesis refers to Wolfke's stay in Karlsruhe in 1912, where he was an assistant to Professor Otto Lehmann – a physicist known as the father of Liquid crystals. In his laboratory Wolfke noticed that it was possible to first record the image on a photographic plate by illuminating the X-ray crystal and then read it with the use of additional optical unit and visible light. Dennis Gabor, during his Nobel lecture said: “I did not know at that time, and neither did Bragg, that Mieczysław Wolfke had proposed this method in 1920, but without realizing it experimentally”.

In 1922, after returning to Poland, Mieczysław Wolfke took up the problem of low temperatures. In 1924 Józef Wierusz-Kowalski – physicist, professor at the Warsaw University of Technology and from 1921 – Polish ambassador in the Hague – offered him a trip to Leiden and cooperation with the Institute of Low Temperatures in Leiden, where professor H. K. Kamerlingh-Onnes and (later) Willem Keesom studied the dielectric constant of liquid helium at various temperatures. The theoretical experiments led him to the discovery of two liquid phases of helium and solidification of helium what Mieczysław Wolfke considered as the third of his greatest achievements. In the early thirties Wolfke started to organize the separated Institute of Low Temperatures at Warsaw University of Technology, even running the first installation.

In 1927 Wolfke worked on the liquid helium dielectric constant and in the next year on the association in liquid dielectrics. He also started cooperation with the Polish Army in Temporary Advisory and Scientific Committee and created many inventions for the soldiers.

In 1930 he presented the theory of multiple associations. He also conducted the research on the point of change in the liquid phase and worked on the experimental finding of light molecules. Einstein mentioned his work at the Berlin Academy of Science.

In 1936 he checked the electric conductivity of liquid helium and started to organize the institute of low temperature at the Warsaw University of Technology. He also worked on the magnetocalorimetric of liquid helium.

In 1937 he found the direct evidence of fulfilment of the law of "action and reaction" for the electrical circuit of any shape. In 1938 he made his final measurements of magnetostriction of liquid oxygen and began researching autoprotonal discharges from palladium hydrogenated anodes.

All Wolfke's plans were crossed by the World War II. From his Institute the German soldiers stole the lab equipment. During the occupation, Wolfke led the Research Institute of Technical Physics at the Warsaw University of Technology (which was controlled by the occupier) and had lectures at the Higher State Technical School. He also organized support for the conspiracy and participated in the underground teaching.

Before the war, in May 1939, Wolfke wrote an article in the magazine "Polish Armed Forces" which was a warning against Nuclear weapons, and in 1945 he wrote a book entitled "Atomic bomb".

During his life he had many opened lectures which were very popular and gathered many listeners.

Organizations  
Mieczysław Wolfke belonged to many different organizations and associations, for example: Prussian Academy of Sciences, Academy of Technical Sciences, Commission of the International Institute of Refrigeration, Warsaw Scientific Society, Polish Physical Society, Polish Academy of Learning in Kraków, Deutsche Physikalische Gesellschaft, Schweizerische Physikalische Gesellschaft, Warsaw Polytechnic Society, Polish Society of Scientific Expeditions, International Cryogenic Commission, French Physical Society, Swiss Physical Society, Polish National Committee of the International Physical Society, Physical Education and Applied Sciences Committee, YMCA and the Grand National Assembly.

Awards and honors 
Mieczysław Wolfke was decorated the Commander's Cross of Polonia Restituta.

References

1883 births
1947 deaths
20th-century Polish physicists
University of Breslau alumni